A Noise Within is an American theatrical company performing classic works of the European canon as well as American playwrights, in rotating repertory. It is based in Pasadena, California.

Awards and nominations

External links
  Official website

Companies based in Los Angeles County, California
Theatre companies in California